Fife is an unincorporated community in McCulloch County, Texas, United States. According to the Handbook of Texas, the community had an estimated population of 32 in 2000.Established by Robert Kaye Finlay 

The community was named after Fife, in Scotland, the ancestral home of a first settler.

References

External links
 

Unincorporated communities in McCulloch County, Texas
Unincorporated communities in Texas